Külhanlı(Bu Gece Barda Gönlüm Hovarda) (tr) is a Turkish folkloric tune (Hasaposerviko ).

See also
For real

References

Turkish music
Turkish songs
Year of song unknown
Songwriter unknown